Black Pearl pepper is a cultivar of Capsicum annuum.  It is characterized by distinctive black leaves and fruit. It was developed by Arboretum Floral and Nursery Plants Research Unit scientists Rob Griesbach and John Stommel of the Agricultural Research Service’s Vegetable Laboratory. This pepper plant is notably similar to another strain, named the Black Hungarian, another designer pepper plant. Though edible (the flavor has a citrus undertone with a slow burn between 4 and 12 times hotter than a jalapeño on the Scoville Scale), it is considered an ornamental plant and even won an award for its beauty from All-Americas Selections in 2006. The Black Pearl has characteristic semi-gloss black to deep-purple leaves with peppers that are black and turn crimson when fully ripened.

References

Capsicum cultivars